Kawetele is an administrative ward in Rungwe District, Mbeya Region, Tanzania. In 2016 the Tanzania National Bureau of Statistics report there were 6,068 people in the ward, from 5,506 in 2012.

Neighborhoods 
The ward has 3 neighborhoods.
 Igogwe
 Kawetele chini
 Kawetele juu

References 

Wards of Mbeya Region
Rungwe District
Constituencies of Tanzania